Cox's Bazar Development Authority is a Bangladesh government development authority responsible for the development of Cox's Bazar.Commodore (Retd) Mohammed Nurul Absar is the Incumbent Chairman after replacing Lieutenant Colonel Forkan Ahmed.

History
Cox's Bazar Development Authority was established in 2016 following the passage of an act in the Parliament. The authority is responsible for developing the plans to turn Cox's Bazar into a major tourist city. In 2019, Prime Minister Sheikh Hasina directed the authority to develop a master plan for the development of Cox's Bazar.

References

2015 establishments in Bangladesh
Organisations based in Cox's Bazar
Government agencies of Bangladesh
Government departments of Bangladesh
Research institutes in Bangladesh